Charlie Engle (born September 20, 1962), is an American ultramarathon runner and author.

Early life and education
Charlie Engle was born on September 20, 1962, to mother Rebecca Ranson and father Richard Engle. His parents were students at University of North Carolina at Chapel Hill (UNC) when Engle was born. In eighth grade, Engle ran his first mile in under five minutes for the first time. After living in California for a time, he moved to Southern Pines, North Carolina with his father and stepmother in 1976 and began attending Pinecrest High School.

Engle enrolled in UNC but soon began to have problems with alcohol and cocaine, which caused him to falter in his academics. During Engle's junior year his father, who was then living in Seattle, Washington came to pick Engle up after a concerned call from one of Engle's fraternity members. Removed from UNC, Engle started to spiral, bouncing from job to job as he battled his addiction to drugs and alcohol.

Years later in July 1992 while Engle was working in Wichita, Kansas, one of his cocaine binges ended with his car being shot at with a spray of bullets. Engle began regularly attending a local Alcoholics Anonymous meeting that day and overcame his addiction. He mentions that day as helping motivate him, stating to Runner's World: "That was my lowest low. The day when I woke up."

Career
Engle started running marathons in 1989. His first was the Big Sur marathon and he ran in several more marathons, including the Boston Marathon, before getting sober. Engle entered his first ultra-marathon by accident in Brisbane, Australia, in 1996, thinking he was entering shorter-distance event. He still managed to win the men's division and began entering endurance competitions around the world. After seeing an Eco-Challenge on the Discovery Channel, Engle registered to participate in one of the events. He described himself as a "documentary filmmaker" despite having limited experience in the hopes that the statement would be self-fulfilling. When Engle was accepted into the Borneo Eco-Challenge he was asked by CBS about having him shoot footage of the event for the series 48 Hours, which ended up using eleven minutes of footage that Engle shot. Following the Borneo challenge, Engle went on several weeks later to complete the annual Ironman Triathlon in Hawaii.

His camerawork for 48 Hours helped Engle get a job as part of the camera crew for Extreme Makeover: Home Edition and eventually he became a producer for the show. During his time with the show, Engle continued doing work in car dent repair and continued competing in endurance events. The contacts he had developed in the entertainment industry from working on Extreme Makeover helped Engle get director James Moll to film a documentary of the Sahara expedition.

Engle published a memoir, Running Man, in 2016.

Legal issues
In 2010, Engle was convicted of 12 counts of mortgage fraud, and served 16 months in federal prison in Beckley, West Virginia before being released to a halfway house.

Running achievements 
 2016 Icebreaker Run Led a 6-person running team across the United States. As a team, the runners ran 24 hours a day for 24 straight days to raise awareness for mental health and addiction services.

References

External links

1962 births
Living people
American male marathon runners
American male ultramarathon runners
People from Chapel Hill, North Carolina
Sportspeople from North Carolina
People from Southern Pines, North Carolina